Argouges is a former commune in the Manche department in the Normandy region in northwestern France. On 1 January 2017, it was merged into the commune Saint-James.

For many centuries the Barons de Gratot (Argouges) resided at the Château de Gratot in Argouges. Similar to the Château de Gratot is the Château de Argouges in Vaux-sur-Aure, in the French department of Calvados, Normandy which had also been owned by the Barons de Gratot (Argouges). According to the French Wikipedia a legend is that a Lord of Argouges met a Fairy woman who agreed to be his wife provided he never spoke the word "Mort" [death] which was considered profane language; however he spoke it and the Fairy vanished; this legend is associated with both Château de Gratot and the Château de Argouges.

Population

Notable people
 Marie-Louise Bouglé (1883-1936), feminist, librarian, and archivist

See also
Communes of the Manche department

References

Former communes of Manche